The 1964 Mexican Grand Prix was a Formula One motor race held at the Ciudad Deportiva Magdalena Mixhuca in Mexico City on October 25, 1964. It was race 10 of 10 in both the 1964 World Championship of Drivers and the 1964 International Cup for Formula One Manufacturers.

It was perhaps the most dramatic finale in the history of the World Championship. Championship points could only be scored by the first six finishers (9–6–4–3–2–1 points). Arriving to the race, three drivers had a chance of winning the title: Graham Hill (BRM P261) with 39 points, John Surtees (Ferrari) with 34, and Jim Clark (Lotus 33-Climax) with 30. In order to win the title, Clark had to win the race, with Surtees finishing not higher than third and Hill not higher than fourth. Surtees could only win the title by finishing first, in each case, or second, unless Hill finished as high as third.

The race began with Clark leading from pole position with Dan Gurney running second in the Brabham-Climax (Gurney had only ten points going into this race having won the French Grand Prix and scored a sixth place at the Belgian Grand Prix). Hill and Lorenzo Bandini, Surtees's teammate, were duelling for third place, with Surtees a distant fifth, seemingly with no chance at winning the title. Then Bandini ran into the back of Hill's BRM, causing him to spin into the Armco, damaging his exhaust and lose a few places. Thereafter Hill's car ran with a crimped exhaust pipe, causing him to lose power. The championship was now firmly in Clark's grasp. If the positions remained the same, he would be champion with four victories to Hill's two, although they would be tied on points at 39. On the penultimate lap, an oil line failed and Clark's engine seized as the Lotus crossed the line, with one lap left to go. The positions were now Gurney–Bandini–Surtees, meaning the championship would be Hill's, so long as Surtees placed no higher. Realizing Surtees could win the title by finishing second, the Ferrari team manager frantically signalled Bandini to slow down as he passed the pits to enter the last lap and let Surtees through. Bandini dutifully did so and Surtees finished second, thus winning the World Championship of Drivers by one point over Hill (40 to 39). Meanwhile, Gurney won the Grand Prix, almost unnoticed. The Ferrari cars were entered by the American NART team and painted white with blue lengthwise "Cunningham racing stripes", the national colours of the teams licensed in the United States.

Classification

Qualifying

Race

Permutations 
 For the first time, 3 British drivers went into the last race with a chance of winning the championship.
 Graham Hill (39pts) needed either:
 1st
 3rd, with Surtees 2nd or lower
 Clark 2nd or lower and Surtees 3rd or lower
 John Surtees (34pts) needed either:
 1st
 2nd, with Graham Hill 4th or lower
 Jim Clark (30pts) needed:
 1st, with Surtees 3rd or lower and Graham Hill 4th or lower
 Jim Clark nearly managed this.  If his engine hadn't blown in the last laps, he would've done just enough to win the championship.
 In another first, three constructors were fighting for the championship.
 Ferrari (43pts) needed either
 1st
 2nd, with the top BRM 3rd or lower
 The top Lotus-Climax 2nd or lower and the top BRM in 3rd or lower
 BRM (42pts) needed
 1st
 Lotus-Climax (37pts) needed
 1st, with the top Ferrari 3rd or lower
 Again, if Jim Clark's engine hadn't blown, then Lotus-Climax would've won the International Cup for F1 Manufacturers

Championship standings after the race 

Drivers' Championship standings

Constructors' Championship standings

 Notes: Only the top five positions are included for both sets of standings. Only best 6 results counted toward the championship. Numbers without parentheses are championship points, numbers in parentheses are total points scored.

Notes

References

External links 
 1964 Mexican Grand Prix at statsf1.com
 1964 Mexican Grand Prix at grandprix.com

Mexican Grand Prix
Mexican Grand Prix
1964 in Mexican motorsport
October 1964 sports events in Mexico